A transcription bubble is a molecular structure formed during DNA transcription when a limited portion of the DNA double helix is unwound. The size of a transcription bubble ranges from 12 to 14 base pairs. A transcription bubble is formed when the RNA polymerase enzyme binds to a promoter and causes two DNA strands to detach. It presents a region of unpaired DNA, where a short stretch of nucleotides are exposed on each strand of the double helix.

RNA polymerase 
The bacterial RNA polymerase, a leading enzyme involved in formation of a transcription bubble, uses DNA template to guide RNA synthesis. It is present in two main forms: as a core enzyme, when it is inactive, and as a holoenzyme, when it is activated. A sigma (σ) factor is a subunit that assists the process of transcription and it stabilizes the transcription bubble when it binds to unpaired bases. These two components, RNA polymerase and sigma factor, when paired together, build RNA polymerase holoenzyme which is then in its active form and ready to bind to a promoter and initiate DNA transcription. Once it binds to the DNA, RNA polymerase turns from a closed to an open complex, forming the transcription bubble. RNA polymerase synthesizes the new RNA in the 5' to 3' direction by adding complementary bases to the 3' end of a new strand. The holoenzyme composition dissociates after transcription initiation, where the σ factor disengages the complex and the RNA polymerase, in its core form, slides along the DNA molecule.

The transcription cycle of bacterial RNA polymerase 
The RNA polymerase holoenzyme binds to a promoter of an exposed DNA strand and begins to synthesize the new strand of RNA. The double helix DNA is unwound and a short nucleotide sequence is accessible on each strand. The transcription bubble is a region of unpaired bases on one of the exposed DNA strands. The starting transcription point is determined by the place where the holoenzyme binds to a promoter. The DNA is unwound and single-stranded at the start site. The DNA promoter interaction is interrupted as the RNA polymerase moves down the template DNA strand and the sigma factor is released. The σ factor is required for the initiation but not for the remaining steps of the DNA transcription. Once the σ factor dissociates from the RNA polymerase, the transcription continues. About 10 synthesized nucleotides of a new RNA strand are required for this to proceed to the elongation step. The process of transcribing during elongation is very fast. Elongation takes place until the RNA polymerase comes across a termination signal (terminator) which arrests the process and causes the release of both the DNA template and the new RNA molecule. The DNA usually encodes the termination signal.

Eukaryotic transcription 
The majority of eukaryotic genes are transcribed by RNA polymerase II, proceeding in the 5' to 3' direction. In eukaryotes, specific subunits within the RNA polymerase II complex allow it to carry out multiple functions. General transcription factors help binding RNA polymerase II to DNA. Promoters are cites where RNA polymerase II binds to start transcription and, in eukaryotes, transcription starting point is positioned at +1 nucleotide. Like all RNA polymerases, it travels along the template DNA, in the 3' to 5' direction and synthesizes a new RNA strand in the 5' to 3' direction, by adding new bases to the 3' end of the new RNA. A transcription bubble occurs as a result of the double stranded DNA unwinding. After about 25 base pairs of the DNA double strand are unwound, RNA synthesis takes place within the transcription bubble region. Supercoiling is also part of this process since DNA regions in front of the RNA polymerase II are unwinding, while DNA regions behind it are rewinding, forming a double helix again.

The RNA polymerase carries out the majority of the steps during the transcription cycle, especially in maintaining the transcription bubble open for the complementary base pairing. There are some steps of the transcription cycle that require more proteins, such as the Rpb4/7 complex and the RNA polymerase attached to the elongation factor transcription factor IIS (TFIIS).

See also
Transcription factors
Transcription (genetics)#Pre-initiation

References 

Genetics
Gene expression